Iggesund Paperboard is a commission company of the Holmen Group and Europe's third largest manufacturer of high quality virgin fibre paperboard. Iggesund has a market share of about 20% in this sector.

History
Iggesund is an industrial village in Sweden. Isak Breant Sr, a businessman and former court commissioner to Queen Kristina, established there a mill in 1685. Iggesunds Bruk (English:mill) was originally an ironworks, and the nearby forests were used to produce charcoal for the factory. In 1771, Iggesund Bruk acquired a small nearby company that made paper, Östanå paper mill. It was one of the first to try to use sawdust and wood to produce paper. However, the technique remained experimental. The mill burnt down in 1842. In 1869, Baron Gustav Tamm became the owner of Iggesunds Bruk, and built a large sawmill. It was a major transformation for the factory, which had always been an ironworks. 
Iggesund's shares were first listed on Stockholmsbörsen in 1949. Lars G. Sundblad introduced paperboard manufacturing at Iggesund, which started in 1963. The merger of MoDo, Holmen and Iggesund resulted in the delisting of Iggesund shares from Stockholmsbörsen (1988), making Iggesund part of the holding, which was renamed to Holmen AB in 2000

Products
Iggesund Paperboard's product range consists of two product families:
Invercote, a solid bleached board (SBB, GZ) with a grammage of 180–400 g/m2 and a thickness of 200-485 μm

Incada,  folding box board (FBB, GC1 and GC2) with a grammage of 200–350 g/m2 and a thickness of 305-640 μm

Mills

Iggesunds Bruk manufactures solid bleached board (SBB, GZ) for the Invercote range in Iggesund, Sweden. 
 two machines with an annual capacity of about 330,000 tons
 produced 262,000 tons of paperboard in 2008
 certified in accordance with ISO 14001 and ISO 9001.
 FSC (Forest Stewardship Council) certified
 PEFC (Programme for the Endorsement of Forest Certification ) certified

Workington manufactures folding box board (FBB, GC1, GC2) for the Incada range in Workington, England
 one machine with an annual capacity of 200,000 tons
 produced 175,000 tons of paperboard in 2010
 certified in accordance with ISO 14001 and ISO 9001 also ISO 18,001
 FSC (Forest Stewardship Council) certified

Ströms Bruk produces plastic-coated and laminated paperboard on the basis of paperboard from Iggesund and Workington at a capacity of 40,000 tons/year in Strömsbruk, Sweden

Locations 

Head Office:
  Iggesund Paperboard AB, Iggesund, Sweden

Sales Offices:
  Iggesund Paperboard Europe, Amsterdam, The Netherlands
  Iggesund Paperboard Asia (HK) Limited, Hong Kong
  Iggesund Paperboard Asia Pte Ltd., Singapore
  Iggesund Paperboard Inc. Sales Office US, Lyndhurst, NJ, United States

Sales Agents: 
 Worldwide

Distribution Terminals: 
  Iggesund, Sweden
  , Ireland
  Krakow, Poland
  Kiel, Germany
  Rotterdam, The Netherlands
  Tilbury, United Kingdom
  Workington, United Kingdom

See also 
 TAPPI.org Technical Association of the Pulp and Paper Industry
 FSC.org Forest Stewardship Council
 PEFC.se Programme for the Endorsement of Forest Certification

References

External links 
 Iggesund.com Iggesund's homepage
 Holmen.com Holmen's homepage

Pulp and paper companies of Sweden
Companies based in Gävleborg County